Beyroutou el lika (Beirut the Encounter) is a 1981 Lebanese drama film directed by Borhane Alaouié. It competed in competition at the 32nd Berlin International Film Festival and the 38th Venice International Film Festival.

Cast
 Haithem el Amine - Haydar
 Nadine Acoury - Zeina
 Najoua Haydar - Zamzam
 Houcem Sabbah - Mustafa
 Renée Dick - Zeina's Mother
 Raafet Haydar - Zeina's brother

References

External links

1981 films
1980s Arabic-language films
1981 drama films
Films directed by Borhane Alaouié
Lebanese Civil War films
Lebanese drama films